2nd Visual Effects Society Awards
February 18, 2004

Best Visual Effects - Motion Picture: 
The Lord of the Rings: The Return of the King

The 2nd Visual Effects Society Awards, given  on February 18, 2004, honored the best visual effects in film and television. The ceremony was held at the Hollywood Palladium and an edited version was broadcast on TechTV.

Winners and nominees
(Winners in bold)

Honorary Awards
Lifetime Achievement Award:
George Lucas

Film

Television

References

External links
 Visual Effects Society

2003
Visual Effects Society Awards
Visual Effects Society Awards
Visual Effects Society Awards
Visual Effects Society Awards